Denis Yuryevich Fedotov (born 15 November 1977) is a Russian professional football coach and a former player.

Club career
He played in the Russian Football National League for FC Dynamo Saint Petersburg in 2003.

References

1977 births
Living people
Russian footballers
Association football defenders
FC Dynamo Saint Petersburg players
FC Khimik-Arsenal players
FC Sever Murmansk players
FC Sheksna Cherepovets players
Russian football managers